Tamás Györök (born 18 March 1979, in Mór) is a Hungarian football (midfielder) player who currently plays for Csákvári TK.

References 
HLSZ 

Living people
1979 births
People from Mór
Hungarian footballers
Association football midfielders
Fehérvár FC players
Veszprém LC footballers
Budapesti VSC footballers
Rákospalotai EAC footballers
BFC Siófok players
Niki Volos F.C. players
FC Sopron players
Újpest FC players
Hungarian expatriate footballers
Expatriate footballers in Greece
Expatriate footballers in Austria
Hungarian expatriate sportspeople in Greece
Hungarian expatriate sportspeople in Austria
Sportspeople from Fejér County